Anthony Masters (1919 – 12 May 1990) was a British production designer and set decorator. He was nominated for an Academy Award in the category Best Art Direction for the film 2001: A Space Odyssey.

He was married to actress Heather Sears from 1957 until his death.

Selected filmography
 Tai-Pan
 Dune
 The Deep
 Papillon
 2001: A Space Odyssey

References

External links
 

1919 births
1990 deaths
British film designers
English set decorators
Best Production Design BAFTA Award winners